The OCAP principles are a set of rules relating to any data concerning First Nations that are being researched and shared about the community. These principles play a critical role in First Nations communities that allow them to gain Ownership, Control, Access, and Possessions of all data being produced about them. It is designed to stop the spread of misinformation that is being released to the public. The principles could be looked at as a political response to colonialism to minimize harm done to the communities.

History 

OCAP was first established by the National Steering Committee in 1998. It was first introduced as OCA by Cathryn George, to guide the development of the First Nation Regional Health Survey. First created to bring governance to data about the communities OCAP was created to ensure that Western communities have rights about information that is being produced about them. In the past, First Nations Communities have had many issues with researchers producing false data about the community. A few examples of misinformation regarding the First Nations were the Bad Blood research from the University of British Columbia, the Barrow of Alcohol study in the 1970s, and the misinformation of the Havasupai Tribe in Arizona in the 1990's. These articles did not get permission to publish from the Indigenous peoples and contained many false claims about the community. However, with more individuals learning and understanding the importance of the principles, more and more articles are abiding by OCAP. The amount of misinformation about the Indigenous Peoples being published is the main reason why OCAP was created. The principles will ensure factual information about the community will only be published.

First Nations Information Governance Center 
The First Nations Governance Center, also known as FNIGC, is a non-profit organization that wants to ensure that every First Nation will acquire data sovereignty. In order to achieve data sovereignty, there are three roles that FNIGC took to do so. The first one being, applying OCAP to all surveys and statistical reports that were led by First Nations. The second role is to support the implementation of OCAP throughout the FNIGC members and partners. The last role the FNIGC will take to achieve data sovereignty is to become the main location for OCAP training, outreach, and education.

Components

Ownership 
Ensures that all First Nations have ownership over all information, research, and data being produced and published about their culture. How individuals own their personal information is the same as a community owning their own information.

Control 
Ensures that all First Nations have control over any information being produced for research projects. This includes the control over the review process, planning process, management of information, and more.

Access 
Ensures that First Nations have access to all information or data that is being published or archived about their community. Also gives First Nations the right to decide who can have access to the information being collected and produced.

Possession 
Ensures First Nations the physical control of any information or data being produced.

Limitations 

OCAP's [rinciple of control has created many conflicts throughout the years as Canada creates new Federal legislation about open information. In 1985 Canada has created the Access to Information Act that allows the public to access any government information. Any information about First Nations that are under the government are given access to the public. OCAP also deals with a lack of knowledge from researchers and the public. An information gap exists regarding the principles, which has led to misinformation about OCAP. An example of this is that some individuals believe any research conducted by a First Nations organization automatically abides by OCAP

References 

 

Wikipedia Student Program
First Nations